David Michael & Co. is an American food flavor company.  It produces more than 40,000 flavors, stabilizers and natural colors for customers worldwide. Founded and based in Philadelphia, the company has facilities in Illinois and California, as well as operations in Mexico, France and China.

History 
In 1896, David Michael & Co. started as a partnership between Herman Hertz, an Atlantic City bar owner and David Michael,  a salesman for the Fleer Chewing Gum Company in Philadelphia.

During that same period, brothers Eli and Robert Rosenbaum and Walter Rosskam formed the R&R Chemical Company, which made cigar wrappers and cigar binding fluids. In 1920, they approached Michael to purchase some guns for their cigar wrapping base.  Michael had developed a product called “Michael’s Mixevan,” a vanilla powder to sell to the ice cream industry. Michael proposed that he, Rosskam and the Rosenbaums become partners.

Michael died in 1935, and ownership of David Michael & Co. passed to Rosskam and the Rosenbaum brothers. Throughout the 20th Century, the company expanded its product line, moved from Center City Philadelphia to the city’s Northeast, and opened operations overseas.

David Michael & Co. remained a family-owned business, with members of the Rosskam and Rosenbaum families in control of operations until 2016, when no one in the fourth generation of the families were interested in joining the team and the third generation decided it was time to sell.  Executive Vice President Operations, George Rosskam, President and COO Skip Rosskam, Executive Vice President and Chief Information Officer Stuart Rosenbaum, and Executive Vice President Steve Rosskam  were the last family members to lead the company.

Successor company 
David Michael & Co.was privately owned and led by two families and their descendants from its founding until its sale to International Flavors & Fragrances in 2016.  IFF also acquired Ottens Flavors at about the same time (also a Philadelphia-based company) which they then merged with David, Michael & Company to create a new division called Tastepoint by IFF.  Skip Rosskam remained with the merged company until February 2021, when he left to form a new consulting venture.

Brands & innovations 
David Michael & Co.'s first product, Old Time Body and Age, is a flavor used to give an aged, mellow taste to newly distilled whiskey. Developed in 1896, this product is still being sold today.

In 1965, the company developed Vanguard, a mix smoothener originally created in response to a worldwide vanilla shortage.

In 1971, they developed Butter Plus, a natural liquid replacement for butter. One pound of butter plus equals 50 pounds of actual butter.

In 2003, David Michael & Co. launched both Cocoa-Mate and Honey-Mate, designed to offer savings in times of high cocoa or honey prices.

The company’s other brands included Biovan, Supervan, DMChoice, Mixevan, Michtex, MichaelLite and Michaelcap.

References 

Companies based in Philadelphia
Food and drink companies of the United States